, was a bureaucrat of the Ryukyu Kingdom.

Zakimi Seifu was born to an aristocrat family called Mō-uji Zakimi Dunchi. He was the 11th head of this family, and his father Zakimi Seichin, was a Sanshikan during Shō Kō's reign.

King Shō Iku dispatched Prince Urasoe Chōki (also known as Shō Genro ) and him in 1839 to celebrate Tokugawa Ieyoshi succeeded as shōgun of the Tokugawa shogunate. They sailed back in the next year.

Zakimi Seifu was selected as a member of Sanshikan in 1847. It was strongly apposed by Seifu. He came into conflict with pro-Japanese factions, including Makishi Chōchū, Onga Chōkō and Oroku Ryōchū. He was impeached by Onga and had to resign in 1858. It was needed to elect a new member of Sanshikan to follow him, and the election was held in the next year. However, Seifu heard about this and accused him. Soon Makishi, Onga and Oroku were removed from their positions and arrested.

References

1801 births
1859 deaths
Ueekata
Sanshikan
People of the Ryukyu Kingdom
Ryukyuan people
19th-century Ryukyuan people